Khandker Golam Faruq is a Bangladeshi police officer and an Additional Inspector General of Police of Bangladesh Police. He is the 35th Commissioner of DMP. Prior to join here, he was the 13th Rector of Police Staff College Bangladesh. Before that he served as Principal of Bangladesh Police Academy, Sardah, Rajshahi. He is a former Deputy Inspector General of Chittagong Range of Bangladesh Police.

Early life and education 
Faruq hailed from Ghatandi Village in Bhuapur Upazila, Tangail District. He completed his graduation from Sher-e-Bangla Agricultural University. He holds Master's Degree in Political Science from a private university.

Career 
Faruq joined Bangladesh Police on 20 January 1991 with 12th Bangladesh Civil Service batch. He served in the 4th Armed Police Battalion based in Bogra District. He then went on to serve in Chittagong Metropolitan Police and Khagrachari District police.

Faruq was the Superintendent of Police of Thakurgaon District in 2005.

In 2006, Faruq was awarded the Bangladesh Police Medal. He served as the Assistant Superintendent of Police of Dhaka District.

In 2015, Faruq was awarded the President Police Medal. He was the Additional Deputy Inspector General of Police of Dhaka Range when Ashulia bank robbery in 2015 was carried by Ansarullah Bangla Team. In 2016, Faruq was promoted to Deputy Inspector General of Police from Additional Inspector General of Police while serving as the joint commissioner of Dhaka Metropolitan Police.

Al Jazeera showed a video of arsonists burning down homes of Santals, tribal miority, in Gaibandha District in presence of police officers of Rangpur Range in 2016; Faruq denied police were involved. In 2017, while Faruq was the Deputy Inspector General of Police of Rangpur Range, member of parliament Manzurul Islam Liton was murdered in Gaibandha which falls under Rangpur Range. In 2017, he arrested a Hindu man whose Facebook post, which allegedly "defamed prophet Mohammad, led to Hindu properties being attacked by Muslims.

Faruq was awarded the Bangladesh Police Medal again in 2018. In 2019, Awami League supporters gangraped a woman, who supported the opposition Bangladesh Nationalist Party, during election night. Faruq visited the victim who living in Noakhali District under Chittagong Range commanded by Faruq.

Faruq also served as the SP in Mymensingh, Jamalpur, Kishoreganj, Jhalakathi and Thakurgaon.

Faruq, deputy inspector general of Chittagong Range, was moved Cox's Bazar to oversee the police following the Murder of Major Sinha Mohammed Rashed Khan. In September 2020, he was transferred to Bangladesh Police Academy as its principal. He was promoted to additional inspector general of police in November 2020. He requested Cabinet Secretary Khandker Anwarul Islam to seek opinion from police officers before appointing public prosecutors in lower courts.

On 23 October 2022, govt appointed him as the next Commissioner of Dhaka Metropolitan Police after Md. Shafiqul Islam retires. He attended the International Association of Police Academies conference in 2022 held in Bangladesh Police Staff College. Prime Minister Sheikh Hasina spoke at the event and was received by Faruq in September.

References 

1964 births
Living people
Bangladeshi police officers
People from Tangail District